The 2022 Northeast Grand Prix (known as the 2022 FCP Euro Northeast Grand Prix for sponsorship reasons) was a sports car race sanctioned by the International Motor Sports Association (IMSA). The race was held at Lime Rock Park in Lakeville, Connecticut on July 16th, 2022. This race was the ninth round of the 2022 IMSA SportsCar Championship, and the sixth round of the 2022 WeatherTech Sprint Cup. 

The race was won by the #9 GTD Pro entry of Pfaff Motorsports, driven by Matt Campbell and Mathieu Jaminet. The GTD class victory was taken by the #1 BMW M4 GT3 of Paul Miller Racing, piloted by Bryan Sellers and Madison Snow. The race for the GTD class victory came down to the last corner, with the leading #57 Mercedes-AMG GT3 of Winward Racing falling victim to a fuel pump failure and fading to fifth in class.

Background
The event marked 50 years since the first IMSA-sanctioned event held at the circuit, which took place as part of the 1972 IMSA GT Championship. As a result, 1972 overall winner Bob Bailey served as the grand marshal for the 2022 edition of the event. As in previous years, it would be the first of two GT-only rounds of the IMSA SportsCar Championship, in which only the GTD Pro and GTD classes competed. In June, Connecticut-based auto parts retailer FCP Euro was announced as the race's title sponsor. FCP Euro also fielded an entry in the Michelin Pilot Challenge event that weekend, which served as the sole IMSA-sanctioned support race. The race, officially labeled the Lime Rock Park 120, was won by the #71 Rebel Rock Racing entry of Frank DePew and Robin Liddell.

On July 6, 2022, IMSA released the latest technical bulletin outlining Balance of Performance for the event. The lone change was a two liter fuel capacity increase for the Lexus RC F GT3.

The #23 Heart of Racing Team entry entered the event as defending GTD-class winners, while the GTD Pro class would compete at Lime Rock for the first time in class history.

Entries

A total of 15 cars took part in the event, split across two classes. 5 cars were entered in GTD Pro, and 10 in GTD.

GTD Pro saw a reduced entry total after the #79 WeatherTech Racing entry of Cooper MacNeil and returning co-driver Jules Gounon moved to the GTD class, having competed in the Pro class for the first six events of the season. MacNeil, an FIA Silver-rated driver, had been eligible to compete in the Pro-Am GTD class for the entire season, and cited the change as an effort to support Mercedes-AMG's push for the GTD manufacturer's championship as well as for undisclosed internal reasons. Jack Hawksworth, who drove the #14 GTD Pro entry for Vasser Sullivan Racing, returned after missing the previous two rounds due to injuries suffered in a motocross accident. 

In GTD, several teams returned after forgoing the international round at Canadian Tire Motorsport Park, which only paid points towards the WeatherTech Sprint Cup. Wright Motorsports and Team Korthoff Motorsports returned, as did CarBahn with Peregrine Racing, who had sourced a replacement Lamborghini Huracán GT3 chassis after damaging their primary car during the 6 Hours of Watkins Glen in June. The Inception Racing McLaren did not return after skipping the race at Mosport, as the team continued to juggle a dual North American and European campaign.

Practice

Practice 1
The first practice session took place at 11:25 AM ET and ended with John Edwards topping the charts for BMW M Team RLL, with a lap time of 51.735.

Practice 2
The second practice session took place at 3:05 PM ET and ended with Matt Campbell topping the charts for Pfaff Motorsports, with a lap time of 51.050.

Warm-Up
The morning warm-up took place at 9:05 AM ET and ended with Jules Gounon topping the charts for WeatherTech Racing, with a lap time of 51.342.

Qualifying
Matt Campbell took overall pole for Pfaff Motorsports, while Frankie Montecalvo and Vasser Sullivan Racing scored pole in GTD.

Qualifying results

Results

Race

References

External links

Northeast Grand Prix
Northeast Grand Prix
Northeast Grand Prix
2022 WeatherTech SportsCar Championship season